Abu Tayur or Abu Teyur may refer to:
 Abu Tayur 1
 Abu Tayur 2
 Abu Tayur 3